Clowesia is a genus of the family Orchidaceae. Species of this genus are epiphytic and contain many pseudobulbs with several internodes. The leaves of this plant are arranged alternatively in two vertical rows on opposite sides of the rachis. Clowesia has a simple gullet flower that allows for pollination by male euglossine bees. The flowers are often unisexual and contain a viscidium.

Species
Seven species of this genus are currently recognized, all native to southern Mexico, Central America, and northern South America.

Hybrids 
Clowesia is in the subtribe Catasetinae, and can be hybridized with the genus Catasetum, giving Clowesetum.

References

 Dressler, Robert L. The Orchids: Natural History and Classification. Cambridge: Harvard University Press, 1981.

External links

Catasetinae genera
Catasetinae